Ilyobacter delafieldii is a motile, gram-negative, obligately anaerobic rod-shaped bacteria, with type strain 10cr1 (=DSM 5704). It is notable for metabolising beta-Hydroxybutyric acid.

References

Further reading

External links

LPSN
Type strain of Ilyobacter delafieldii at BacDive -  the Bacterial Diversity Metadatabase

Fusobacteriota
Bacteria described in 1991